Mortagne-sur-Sèvre (literally Mortagne on Sèvre) is a commune in the Vendée department in the Pays de la Loire region in western France. The commune was formed by the consolidation Mortagne-sur-Sèvre, Évrunes and Saint-Hilaire-de-Mortagne in 1964.

Population

See also
Communes of the Vendée department

References

Communes of Vendée